Robert John "Bob" Neilson (9 August 1923 – 14 October 2014) was a New Zealand rugby league player who represented New Zealand.

Playing career
Born in Reefton in 1923, Neilson played for West Coast at a provincial level, and was a member of the New Zealand national rugby league team in 1952 and 1953.

He toured Australia with the New Zealand national rugby league team in 1952 but didn't appear in the test matches. However, he appeared in all three tests in the 1953 series against the Kangaroos in New Zealand, scoring the match-winning and series-clinching try in a 12–11 victory in the second test in Wellington.

References

1923 births
2014 deaths
People from Reefton
New Zealand rugby league players
New Zealand national rugby league team players
West Coast rugby league team players
Rugby league second-rows
Rugby league players from West Coast, New Zealand